John Michael Hall is the Secretary of the Pennsylvania Department of Aging. He was appointed in 2008 and confirmed in 2009.

References

Living people
State cabinet secretaries of Pennsylvania
Year of birth missing (living people)
Place of birth missing (living people)
21st-century American politicians